Bibhuprasad Mohapatra (born 1991) is an Odia writer from Odisha, India. He has popularized science in both English and Odia. He began contributing regularly to English and Odia newspapers and magazines in 2012. He is a regular contributor to Press Information Bureau (PIB).

Early life 

Bibhuprasad was born on 14 May 1991 in a pious Brahmin family in Bhogada village, in the Khordha district of the Indian state of Odisha. His primary education was at Bhogada UGME school. He completed his schooling from Bhogada High School in 2007. He secured 150 out of 150 in mathematics on his H.S.C. Examination. He completed 2 years of science from Banki Autonomous College in 2009. He earned a bachelor of science degree in mathematics and computing from the Institute of Mathematics and Applications, Bhubaneswar and master degree in Odia literature from Odisha State Open University (OSOU).

Career

He started his columnist career at an early age. He has published over 150 articles, stories, and features in leading newspapers and magazines, including Science Reporter, National Book Trust's Reader's Club Bulletin, The Samaj, Dharitri, Anupama Bharat, Prajatantra, Bigyan Diganta, Science Park, and Science Horizon.

Publications 
"Climate Change"
 "Eminent Physicist" 
 "Evolutionary Biologist : J B S Haldane" 
"Remembering the Savior of Countless Mothers" 
 "Douglas Engelbert : Inventor of Computer Mouse" 
 "Prof. C R Rao : An Eminent Statistician" .
 "Jala : Chinta O Anuchinta" 
 "Quiz"

References

1991 births
Living people
Odia-language writers
Journalists from Odisha
People from Khordha district